Benzylfentanyl (R-4129) is a fentanyl analog. It was temporarily placed in the US Schedule I by emergency scheduling in 1985 due to concerns about its potential for abuse as a designer drug, but this placement was allowed to expire and benzylfentanyl was formally removed from controlled substance listing in 2010, after the DEA's testing determined it to be "essentially inactive" as an opioid. Benzylfentanyl has a Ki of 213 nM at the mu opioid receptor, binding around 1/200 as strong as fentanyl itself, though it is still slightly more potent than codeine.

Side effects of fentanyl analogs are similar to those of fentanyl itself, which include itching, nausea, and potentially serious respiratory depression which can be life-threatening. Fentanyl analogs have killed hundreds of people throughout Europe and the former Soviet republics since the most recent resurgence in use began in Estonia in the early 2000s, and novel derivatives continue to appear.

Legal status
In the United States, fentanyl-related substances are Schedule I controlled substances.  Benzylfentanyl is illegal in Germany (Anlage I)

See also
 Homofentanyl
 Isofentanyl

References

Piperidines
Synthetic opioids
Anilides